Koffi is a surname and masculine given name. It may refer to:

Surname
 Abdoulaye Koffi (born 1991), Ivorian footballer
 Alain Koffi (born 1983), French basketball player 
 Andaman Koffi (born 1985), Ivorian footballer
 Antoine Koffi (born 1999), Italian rugby union player
 Christian Koffi (born 1990), Ivorian footballer
 Christian Koffi (footballer, born 2000), French footballer
 Erwin Koffi (born 1995), French footballer
 Hervé Koffi (born 1996), Burkinabe football goalkeeper
 Jean-Christophe Koffi (born 1998), Ivorian footballer
 Jean Romaric Kevin Koffi (born 1986), Ivorian footballer
 Léon Konan Koffi (1928–2017), Ivorian politician, Interior Minister of the Ivory Coast
 Mechac Koffi (born 1988), Ivorian footballer
 Mohamed Koffi (born 1986), Ivorian-born Burkinabé footballer
 Nadège Koffi (born 1989), Ivorian former footballer
 N'Dri Philippe Koffi (born 2002), Ivorian footballer
 Olié Koffi (born 1984), Ivorian footballer
 Patrick Koffi (born 2001), American soccer player

Given name
 Koffi Boua (born 1986), Ivorian footballer
 Koffi Dakoi (born 1999), Ivorian footballer
 Koffi Djidji (born 1992), French footballer
 Koffi Nicolas Dognon (born 1989), Niger-born, Beninese retired footballer
 Koffi Gahou (1947–2019), Beninese artist, actor and director
 Koffi Gueli (born 1993), Togolese footballer
 Koffi Kouamé (born 1995), Ivorian footballer
 Koffi Kouao (born 1998), Ivorian footballer
 Koffi Kwahulé (born 1956), Ivorian novelist and playwright
 Koffi Idowu Nuel (born 1977), stage name Koffi, Nigerian comedian, musician and actor
 Koffi Olympio (born 1975), Togolese former footballer
 Koffi Panou (1947–2003), Togolese politician and diplomat
 Koffi Sama (born 1944), Prime Minister of Togo 2002 to 2005

Stage name
 Koffi, Nigerian comedian, musician and actor Koffi Idowu Nuel (born 1977)
 Koffi Olomide, Antoine Christophe Agbepa Mumba (born 1956), Congolese Soukus singer, dancer, producer and composer

See also
 Kofi (disambiguation)

Masculine given names